Derby Grammar School is a selective independent school in Littleover near the city of Derby, England. Founded in 1995, to recreate the historical Derby School, (which had become mixed-Comprehensive in the 1970s, and then changed name in 1989), it educates girls and boys between the ages of 4 to 18. 

The school currently has about two hundred and forty pupils. The Sixth form has been co-educational since September 2007, and an Infant school was opened in September 2019.

Admissions

The school is academically selective; scholarships and bursaries offering a discount on the school's fees are available.

Premises 
The school occupies Rykneld Hall, a Grade II listed 18th-century country house at Littleover, built in 1780 as a private residence and used as a hospital in the second half of the 20th century. After conversion, the school was opened in 1995.

Teaching buildings for Humanities, Sciences, Design and Technology, and Arts have been added to the campus, along with the main school hall, which is linked with the old quadrangle and contains a stage and an organ, with an attached kitchen. The new block, called the Bagshaw Building, was opened in 2000. There is also a cricket pavilion.

The woodland, mature trees, grassland, and water areas in the school's grounds are designated as Wildlife Site 38 and safeguarded in the City of Derby's Local Plan, Policy E4 (Nature Conservation). Such sites are "considered irreplaceable".

New school sports facility, Rykneld Sports Centre, located a short distance away from the main site, was opened in September 2017.

Curriculum 
The curriculum is built around teaching for GCSE and A-level. Subjects taught include English, Latin, French, German, Spanish, Classics, Maths, Chemistry, Physics, Biology, History, Ancient History, English Literature, Geography, Religious Studies, Art, Music, Design Technology and Economics.

Sport 
The main sports offered at the school are cricket, hockey, and rugby union, plus athletics, cross country, swimming, squash, basketball and badminton.

Extra-curricular 
Activities include school dramatic productions, the Duke of Edinburgh Award, public speaking, World Challenge, debating, a School choir and orchestra, adventure training and the Arts Award examined by LAMDA. There are music and drama workshops, some being joint events with Derby High School for Girls and the Hot House Music Schools youth music group.

The School supports various charities, including YMCA Derbyshire and the Gedeli B School in the Mwanza Region of Tanzania. It raises money annually for both projects and sends Sixth Form students out every year to Gedeli B School to assist with teaching, maintenance of classrooms and other tasks.

School motto, arms and badge 

The school's coat of arms, badge, and motto, are all based on those of the former Derby School. The motto, Vita Sine Litteris Mors (Life without learning is death), is that of the former school and is a quotation from Seneca's Epistulae morales ad Lucilium.

Old Derbeians
The term "Old Derbeians" originally meant only former pupils of Derby School, but  the Old Derbeians Society is now open also to ex-pupils of the new school, who are called both New and Old Derbeians.
Those educated at the new school include:
Ben Bradley (born 1989), Conservative member of parliament

See also
Listed buildings in Littleover

References 

Derby Grammar School at BBC Education League Tables
Derby Grammar School at dfes.gov.uk
Independent Schools Inspectorate report of Derby Grammar School 2005 inspection
Derby Grammar School buildings by Rothera Goodwin, website no longer active
City of Derby Local Plan

External links
Derby Grammar School – official site
Web site of the Old Derbeians Society
"Derby School – the Sixties Revisited" a short film shot in St Helen's House in 2012

Boys' schools in Derbyshire
Private schools in Derby
Member schools of the Headmasters' and Headmistresses' Conference
Member schools of the Independent Schools Association (UK)
Educational institutions established in 1995
1995 establishments in England